Munda Airport  is an international airport adjacent to the town of Munda, Western Province in Solomon Islands.

Originally built by Japanese forces during World War II and further developed by the  U. S. Naval Construction Battalions 24 and 73 following its capture. After the war, the airfield became a commercial airport for regional flights.
In 2015, a New Zealand government aid and development project significantly upgraded the field to an international airport. The upgrade included the removal of a large amount of unexploded ordnance left behind by vacating Japanese and US forces. Although there were no  international flights scheduled by 2019, the main economic purpose of the upgrade is to serve as an alternate field for international flights to Honiara International Airport, significantly reducing the fuel load and improving the economics of the flight. For example, prior to the Munda upgrade, a flight from Brisbane to Honiara had to carry sufficient fuel to return to Brisbane because that was the nearest viable alternate.

Airlines and destinations

World War II

The Munda Point airfield was first built in World War II by Japanese forces.

Construction began in mid-November with a great emphasis on keeping the forward airfield secret. The majority of airfield work done before clearing the main runway and surfacing it with crushed coral. By wiring the tops of palm trees to keep them in place, allowing work to initially escape detection. Finally the trunks were cut away, and runway completed.

Despite these efforts, reports of the strip were relayed to Guadalcanal via a Solomon Island coastwatcher resident in Munda, Danny Kennedy, who notified the British Solomon Island Defence Force in Honiara by radio. Subsequent aerial reconnaissance spotted increased barge traffic and evidence of crushed coral being prepared at the strip, but the Japanese succeeded in buying enough time to complete a single  by   all weather runway for fighters operational on 17 December 1942.

Opened on 1 December 1942, it was used by the Japanese Navy and Japanese Army Air Force as a forward operating base. As soon as it was operational, the airfield was hampered by the observation of Australian, New Zealand and Solomon Islander coastwatchers in the area, including Kennedy and D.C. Horton who was observing the airfield from Rendova. It was heavily bombed from the air by the Allies prior to the American landing.

Munda airfield, also known as Munda or Munda Point Airfield, was the principal objective of the New Georgia campaign. Following the Allied Landings on Rendova on 30 June 1943, the Drive on Munda Point during July and the Japanese New Georgia counterattack in Mid-July, Munda airfield was captured by the US Army XIV Corps forces after fierce fighting in the jungle area. The high ground around the airfield was captured on August 5, 1943.

Once seized, Seabees from the 47th and 63rd Naval Construction Battalions improved and expanded the airbase for U.S. operations. The first American aircraft landed at Munda on August 14, 1943 with landings by F4U Corsairs piloted by Robert Owen of VMF-215, a 44th Fighter Squadron (44th FS) P-40 Warhawk and a J2F Duck with Marine Brigadier General Francis P. Mulcahy aboard.

Known American air units stationed at Munda Airfield were:

 United States Navy
 VC-24 operating SBDs
 VC-40 operating TBFs
 VF-33 operating F6Fs
 VF-38 operating F6Fs
 CASU 14 (Carrier Aircraft Service Unit)
 VB-98 operating SBDs
 VB-148 operating PV-1s
 VB-140 operating PV-1s

 United States Army Air Forces
 5th Bombardment Group, 4 February-7 April 1944
 307th Bombardment Group, 28 January-29 April 1944

 United States Marine Corps
 ComAir New Georgia
 VMSB-236 operating SBDs
 VMF-124 operating F4Us
 VMF-213 operating F4Us
 VMF-214 operating F4Us
 VMF-215 operating F4Us
 VMF-221 operating F4Us
 MABS-1
 VMSB-142 operating SBDs
 VMTB-232 operating TBFs
 VMSB-341 operating SBDs
 VMTB-143 operating TBFs

See also

 Ondonga Airfield
 USAAF in the South Pacific

References

 Maurer, Maurer (1983). Air Force Combat Units Of World War II. Maxwell AFB, Alabama: Office of Air Force History. .
 

Specific

External links
Solomon Airlines Routes

Airports in the Solomon Islands
Airfields of the United States Army Air Forces in the Pacific Ocean theatre of World War II